Leonard Hilburne Gabrielson (September 8, 1915 – November 14, 2000) was a first baseman in Major League Baseball who appeared in five games for the Philadelphia Phillies during the 1939 season.

Gabrielson's son, also named Len Gabrielson, spent nine seasons in Major League Baseball.

External links

1915 births
2000 deaths
Philadelphia Phillies players
Baseball players from Oakland, California
Major League Baseball first basemen
Wheeling Stogies players
Johnstown Johnnies players
Norfolk Tars players
Seattle Rainiers players
Oakland Oaks (baseball) players
Baltimore Orioles (IL) players
Hollywood Stars players
Binghamton Triplets players